The Sierra Madre Dam is a dam on Little Santa Anita Creek, at the mouth of Little Santa Anita Canyon, in Los Angeles County, California. It is in the San Gabriel Mountains, south of the Angeles National Forest, on the northern border of Sierra Madre.

History 
As a result of the flood of 1914, which caused an estimated $10,000,000 in property damage, in the San Gabriel Valley, the California Legislature implemented The Los Angeles County Flood Control Act that entailed a systematic study for flood relief. Results showed an average of 60,000 acre feet of water, valuing between half a million to one million dollars, being wasted from the San Gabriel Mountain watershed into the ocean that could otherwise be conserved and domestically used for nearly half a million people.

In 1924, a bond issue was approved by voters in the amount of $35,300,00 to build systems that would store and conserve water including eight dams - Thompson Creek, Big Dalton, San Gabriel, Big Santa Anita, Eaton Canyon, Big Tujunga, Pacoima, Puddingstone, and Sierra Madre.

Dam
Construction was completed in 1928. It is owned by Los Angeles County Department of Public Works. At the lower face of the dam, water can be released out of a steel grille covered  diameter outlet onto a spillway, and then into channelized Little Santa Anita Creek.

In the 1940s CCC—Civilian Conservation Corps workers built the concrete channel containing the creek, from the dam through  adjacent Sierra Madre. They also constructed public street bridges and footbridges across the channel in the Sierra Madre Canyon neighborhood.

Reservoir–debris basin
The upstream drainage basin for Little Santa Anita Creek is much larger.

Little Santa Anita Creek is a tributary of Santa Anita Creek, which is a tributary of the Rio Hondo at their confluence in Whittier Narrows. The Rio Hondo is a major tributary of the Los Angeles River.

The dam and debris basin–reservoir are used for flood and sediment control, and for downstream fish habitat protection.

Access
Access to the dam is restricted by locked gates and chain link fencing across the public Sierra Madre Canyon neighborhood side.

To the west, on Mount Wilson Trail Road in the neighborhood, there is a trailhead for the historic Mount Wilson Trail, a hiking trail that climbs up through Little Santa Anita Canyon to reach Mount Wilson. Other trails, now within the Angeles National Forest, branch off it to the creek for canyoneering, and to other views and destinations.

See also 
 List of dams and reservoirs in California

References 

Los Angeles County Department of Public Works dams
Arch dams
San Gabriel Mountains
Sierra Madre, California
Dams completed in 1928
Civilian Conservation Corps in California
1928 establishments in California